East Timor participated in the 2009 Southeast Asian Games in the city of Vientiane, Laos from 9 December 2009 to 18 December 2009.

Expectations 
Before the games, East Timor was preparing its national athletes locally. Its Olympic Committee planned that East Timor should join more sports this time compared to those of the previous SEAG editions. Also, East Timor was expecting to boost its medal tally and finally gain a silver and a gold medal in the biennial event.

Medal tally

Medalists

By sport

Boxing

East Timor participated in the sport of boxing at the 2009 Southeast Asian Games. The country sent two athletes namely: Oriando dos Santos and Manuel Batisia. Oriando dos Santos contested in the men's light flyweight division and gained a bronze medal when he lost to Harry Tanamor of Philippines. The latter joined the men's featherweight division but lost early to Charly Suarez of Philippines thus losing hope of gaining a medal.

Karate

East Timor also participated in the sport of karatedo at the 2009 Southeast Asian Games. It participated in the women's individual and team kumite division. Furthermore, it became a source of medal for East Timor. The karateka, Sonia Soarescorreia, won a bronze medal in the women's kumite division - 61 kg and below.

Taekwondo

East Timor also participated in the sport of taekwondo at the 2009 Southeast Asian Games. It sent two athletes to join the sport. Those were: Leonel Alves Almeida and Mateus João Felgueiras. Almeida competed in the men's flyweight division while Felgueiras competed in the men's finweight division. In addition, the sport also became a source of medal of East Timor at the 2009 Southeast Asian Games. Almeida won a bronze medal.

References

2009
Southeast Asian Games
Nations at the 2009 Southeast Asian Games